(2 October 1963 – 15 April 2013) was a Japanese film director, actor, screenwriter, and producer.

Life and career
Ueno began his film career as an assistant director on  director Toshiki Satō's debut film  aka Dream Woman (1989). Ueno acted as an "advance guard" for the pinku shichifukujin group of directors when his Keep on Masturbating: Non-Stop Pleasure (1994) became the first film to win the "Best Film" award at the Pink Grand Prix. Ueno was also awarded Best Director at the ceremony.
Ueno's 2003 film Ambiguous also won the Best Film prize at the Pink Grand Prix. Ueno was given a six-film career retrospective at Tokyo's Athénée Francais in September 2004.

Bibliography

English

Japanese

References

External links
 

 
|-
! colspan="3" style="background: #DAA520;" | Pink Grand Prix
|-

1963 births
Japanese male film actors
Japanese film directors
Pink film directors
Japanese screenwriters
2013 deaths